{{Speciesbox
| taxon = Calidifontibacter indicus
| authority = Ruckmani et al. 2011<ref name="Ruckmani">{{cite journal|last1=Ruckmani|first1=A|last2=Kaur|first2=I|last3=Schumann|first3=P|last4=Klenk|first4=HP|last5=Mayilraj|first5=S|title=Calidifontibacter indicus gen. nov., sp. nov., a member of the family Dermacoccaceae isolated from a hot spring, and emended description of the family Dermacoccaceae|journal=International Journal of Systematic and Evolutionary Microbiology|date=October 2011|volume=61|issue=Pt 10|pages=2419–24|doi=10.1099/ijs.0.025593-0|pmid=21075908|doi-access=free}}</ref>
| type_strain = DSM 22967JCM 16038MTCC 8338PC IW02
| synonyms = 
}}Calidifontibacter indicus is a Gram-positive and non-motile bacterium from the genus of Calidifontibacter'' which has been isolated from spring water from the Western Ghats in India.

References

 

Micrococcales
Bacteria described in 2011